Time Warp is an album released by Chick Corea in 1995.

Track listing 
All tracks by Chick Corea.
 "One World Over (Prologue)" – 0:51
 "Time Warp" – 3:11
 "The Wish" – 7:39
 "Tenor Cadenza" – 1:46
 "Terrain" – 6:05
 "Arndok's Grave" – 4:33
 "Bass Intro to Discovery" – 3:20
 "Discovery" – 9:04
 "Piano Intro to New Life" – 4:07
 "New Life" – 11:08
 "One World Over" – 5:29

Personnel 
 Chick Corea – piano
 John Patitucci – bass
 Gary Novak – drums
 Bob Berg – saxophones

Charts

References

External links 
 Chick Corea - Official Website: http://www.chickcorea.com/

Chick Corea albums
GRP Records albums
1995 albums